The 2014 Alaska Senate elections were held on Friday, November 4, 2014, with the primary elections on August 19, 2014. Voters in the 10 districts of the Alaska Senate elected their representatives. The elections coincided with the elections for the state assembly.

Overview

Results

District A

District C

District E

District F

District G

District I

District K

District M

District N

District O

District P

District Q

District S

District T

References 

2014 Alaska elections
Alaska Senate
2014